White Dog Fell from the Sky is a 2013 novel by Eleanor Morse. The book was published on January 3, 2013 through Viking Adult and is set in 1970s apartheid South Africa.

Synopsis
White Dog Fell from the Sky is set in Botswana in the late 1970s and follows three characters as their lives interact with one another. Isaac Muthethe is from South Africa, still under apartheid. He had a promising future as a medical student until he was forced to flee to Botswana after watching the South African Defence Force kill someone. Once in Botswana, Isaac works as a gardener for Alice Mendelssohn, an American postgrad student who has left her studies behind in order to accompany her husband. The two strike up a friendship of sorts and when Isaac goes missing, Alice decides that she must find him.

Development
Initial development for the character of Alice began over twelve years ago, with Morse creating her as a character for a different book that was never completed. She developed the character of Isaac later, while teaching a fiction writing class. Morse also stated that she drew upon her own experiences of Botswana, utilizing several words and phrases in Setswana to accent the novel.

Reception
Critical reception for White Dog Fell from the Sky has been mostly positive, with Oprah.com listing it as one of their 16 Must-Read Books for January 2013. Common praise for the novel included the depictions of Botswana and for Morse's writing, while Kirkus Reviews criticized the book saying that the "idealization of Isaac and all the black Africans as noble victims does them a disservice by making them two-dimensional in contrast to the three-dimensional whites".

Reviewer Sara Vilkomerson gave the book the grade of B+ and wrote, "Morse's writing is lyrical and quite beautiful, with searing descriptions of the dusty earth, unforgiving sun, and stark skies. The inner workings of her main characters' minds may remain a mystery, but that doesn't stop you from getting attached to their respective heartaches and plights and rooting for their happiness."

References

2013 American novels
Novels set in Botswana
Fiction set in 1976
Viking Press books